The Norfield Historic District is a  historic district in Weston, Connecticut, United States, that was listed on the National Register of Historic Places in 1991.  It includes the present-day town center of Weston, which was known as "Norfield" from 1795 to 1920.

It was listed for its meeting architectural criteria, and included 16 contributing buildings.  The district includes a total of 25 institutional and residential buildings, of which nine are more modern and non-contributing including the town hall and town library.  The Norfield Congregational Church is the most prominent building.

Norfield Congregational Church
Built in 1831, the church is located at 64 Norfield Road and still holds Sunday services. The church property includes the Christian Education Building, a parish hall, a parking area, a memorial garden and a front lawn including the Weston World War II memorial.

See also
National Register of Historic Places listings in Fairfield County, Connecticut

References

National Register of Historic Places in Fairfield County, Connecticut
Federal architecture in Connecticut
Greek Revival architecture in Connecticut
Colonial Revival architecture in Connecticut
Weston, Connecticut
Historic districts in Fairfield County, Connecticut
Historic districts on the National Register of Historic Places in Connecticut
Buildings and structures in Weston, Connecticut